is a railway station on the Hachinohe Line operated by East Japan Railway Company (JR East) in the city of Hachinohe, Aomori Prefecture, Japan.

Lines
Ōkuki Station is served by the Hachinohe Line, and is 21.8 kilometers from the starting point of the line at Hachinohe Station.

Station layout
Ōkuki Station has a single ground-level side platform serving one bi-directional track. There is a small rain shelter built on top of the platform, but there is no station building. The station is unattended.

History
The station was opened on December 10, 1956. With the privatization of Japanese National Railways (JNR) on April 1, 1987, it came under the operational control of JR East.

Surrounding area
Tanesashi Coast
Hachinohe Minami Junior High School

See also
List of Railway Stations in Japan

External links

  

Railway stations in Aomori Prefecture
Railway stations in Japan opened in 1956
Hachinohe Line
Hachinohe
Stations of East Japan Railway Company